Belvedere Garden is one of the largest-scale private housing estates in Tsuen Wan, New Territories, Hong Kong, located at the seaside of Tsuen Wan West.

Developed by Cheung Kong Holdings, it comprises 6,016 flats in 19 high rise residential towers developed in 3 phases. It was designed to be a self-contained community and was designed with a shopping arcade and a wet market.

History
The estate was completed between 1987 and 1991.

In 2001, the Hang Seng Bank branch at the estate was robbed by Tsui Po-ko, a police officer.

Demographics
According to the 2016 by-census, Belvedere Garden had a population of 18,745. The median age was 43.1 and the majority of residents (92.6 per cent) were of Chinese ethnicity. The average household size was 3.2 people. The median monthly household income of all households (i.e. including both economically active and inactive households) was HK$47,500.

Politics
For the 2019 District Council election, the estate fell within two constituencies. Phase 1 and Phase 2 are located in the Lai To constituency, which was formerly represented by Ronald Tse Man-chak until July 2021, while Phase 3 falls within the Tsuen Wan West constituency, which was formerly represented by Angus Yick Shing-chung until July 2021.

Education
Belvedere Garden is in Primary One Admission (POA) School Net 62, which includes schools in Tsuen Wan and areas nearby. The net includes multiple aided schools and one government school, Hoi Pa Street Government Primary School.

Covid Pandemic
Block 4, Belvedere Garden Phase 2 was placed under lockdown on 19 April 2021 for mandatory testing.

See also
 Serenade Cove

References

Private housing estates in Hong Kong
Residential buildings completed in 1991
Tsuen Wan West
CK Hutchison Holdings
1991 establishments in Hong Kong